At Vine St. Live is a 1991 live album by Anita O'Day.

Track listing 
 "You'd Be So Nice to Come Home To" (Cole Porter) – 5:41
 "Old Devil Moon" (Yip Harburg, Burton Lane) – 4:23
 "Is You Is or Is You Ain't My Baby" (Bill Austin, Louis Jordan) – 4:22
 "A Song for You" (Leon Russell) – 3:05
 "You Can Depend on Me" (Charles Carpenter, Louis Dunlap, Earl Hines) – 3:47
 "Street of Dreams" (Sam M. Lewis, Victor Young) – 6:04
 "You Turned the Tables on Me" (Louis Alter, Sidney D. Mitchell) – 4:09
 "Yesterday"/"Yesterdays" (Lennon and McCartney)/(Otto Harbach, Jerome Kern) – 3:48
 "S'posin'" (Paul Denniker, Andy Razaf) – 3:59
 "It Don't Mean a Thing (If It Ain't Got That Swing)" (Duke Ellington, Irving Mills) – 3:52

Personnel 
 Anita O'Day – vocals
 Gordon Brisker - Tenor Sax & Flute
 Pete Jolly - Piano
 Bob Maize - Bass
 Steve Homan - Guitar
 Danny D'Imperio - Drums
 Recorded live at The Vine Street Bar & Grill, Hollywood CA., August 2 & 3, 1991.

References 

1991 live albums
Anita O'Day live albums